Statue of Mihai Eminescu may refer to:

Statue of Mihai Eminescu, Galați
Statue of Mihai Eminescu, Iași
Statue of Mihai Eminescu, Montreal